Kanal 11 (formerly TV11 and before that TV400) is a conditional access, entertainment channel owned by Warner Bros. Discovery EMEA. Its target audience is younger people and it almost solely broadcasts entertainment programmes.

The channel was launched in January 2005 to replace the interactive Mediteve channel that occupied the same space. Programming on the channel consists of action and drama series, reality series, movies and comedy. Kanal 11 also features some original programming and programmes connected to shows on TV4, such as Idol. The channel is broadcast by satellite, cable, IPTV and on the digital terrestrial network.

On 19 January 2011, the channel was relaunched and renamed TV11. Among the new programmes made for TV11 are another season of Big Brother.

On 1 June 2013, TV4 Group sold TV11 to SBS Discovery Media. On 1 October 2013, it became Kanal 11.

Foreign programs 

 The Jerry Springer Show
 The Secret Circle
 The Secret Life of the American Teenager
 The Walking Dead
 The Vampire Diaries
 The Originals
 T@gged
 Light as a Feather
 Supergirl (TV Series)
 The Flash (2014 TV series)
 Arrow
 Pretty Little Liars
 True Blood
 Teen Wolf
 Gossip Girl
 Once Upon a Time
 Riverdale
 Killjoys

References

External links
 

Television channels in Sweden
Television channels and stations established in 2005
Warner Bros. Discovery networks
2005 establishments in Sweden
Warner Bros. Discovery EMEA